Roald is a village in Giske Municipality in Møre og Romsdal county, Norway. The village is located on the northern part of the island Vigra. Vigra Church is also located a short distance south of Roald.

The village of Roald was the administrative centre of the old Roald Municipality that existed from 1890 until its dissolution in 1964. The former municipality was later renamed Vigra Municipality. Since 1964, it has been a part of Giske Municipality.

References

Giske
Villages in Møre og Romsdal